Dear John is a British sitcom, written by John Sullivan. Two series and a special were broadcast in 1986 and 1987.

The sitcom's title refers to "Dear John" letters, usually written by women to their partners as a means of ending a relationship. John discovers in the opening episode that his wife is leaving him for a friend. He is kicked out of his home, while still being expected to pay the mortgage, and forced to find lodgings. In desperation, he joins the 1-2-1 Singles Club and meets other people (whom one could describe as misfits), who have fared equally unfortunately in their romantic lives. The outside shots of houses were filmed in Melthorne Drive, South Ruislip.

In 1988, an American adaptation of Dear John was produced by Paramount for the NBC network, starring Judd Hirsch. That series lasted for four seasons.

Characters

Major characters 
John Lacey (Ralph Bates) — a secondary-school teacher whose wife leaves him for his best friend, Mike. He is thrown out of his home but has to continue paying the mortgage on it, while living in a bedsit. Although John's wife is manipulative and John can be considered the wronged party, he admits in retrospect that he may have neglected her emotionally. He feels cut off from his son, to whom he has access only on Sundays. They end up at the zoo because it's the only place open; his son saying they've seen one penguin so many times that the first time they came "he was an egg".  John's problems come from an inability, or unwillingness, to confront people or from being "too nice" – giving rise to situations that can rebound in unexpected ways.
Kate (Belinda Lang) — an outwardly frigid woman with three failed marriages. She continually spars with Kirk, whose growing lust for her becomes a running theme. At one point, she shares a bed with John, although it is suggested that nothing more than sleeping happened, as they were both drunk at the time. Eventually, she goes to Greece and finds a boyfriend (much to Kirk's dismay), only to make a surprise reappearance in the show's final episode.
Ralph Dring (Peter Denyer) — a shy, timid  and rather glum man with absolutely no image at all; whose only real friend is a terrapin named Terry and who married a Polish woman called Blomlika. She was a defector who (as Ralph tells it), worked as a welder at the Gdańsk Shipyard, was smuggled out of Poland by her brother by "hiding in the bottom of a Polish Army mobile field kitchen" and deserted Ralph on their wedding day. He develops a genuine friendship with Kirk, even though Kirk holds his boring demeanour in some disdain. He often gives Kirk a lift home on his motorcycle combination due to Kirk's 'Porsche' always "being in dock". In series two, Ralphy (as Kirk calls him) makes a "shrewd investment" by buying a mobile discotheque from a friend and adopts the persona of disc jockey Dazzling Darren Dring; a name conjured up by Kirk. Unfortunately, he only has two records in his 'collection'; Green Door by Shakin' Stevens, and another unnamed track which is scratched, so is never played. His microphone patter and act are not nearly as glitzy as his name - unanimated and interjecting his performance with such comments as "Get down", "Do that funky thing" and "Don't give me that jive, Clive" in his normal monotone voice.
Kirk St Moritz / Eric Morris (Peter Blake) — a crass, tactless chauvinist, who claims to drive a Porsche (although the audience never sees it) and dresses in the style of John Travolta in Saturday Night Fever.  Kirk (who claims to be a spy) is shown at the end of series one to be nothing more than an alter ego created by Eric Morris who, though he is in his mid-thirties, lives in shabby circumstances with an overbearing mother who calls him "Big Ears". His room contains a number of toy guns and models, whilst the walls are covered with action movie posters. In reality, he still has the mindset of a teenager who longs for a more exciting life. His long, rambling and often preposterous anecdotes about his "experiences" cruising the California highways on his Harley Davidson, seducing nuns, military service with the Royal Marines and clandestine missions during the Vietnam War with his "buddy" Wang, contrast in the second season with the audience's newly gained knowledge that Eric is really a sad, shy man who has made little impact in wider life. In the series' final episode, however, we see that perhaps there are aspects of Kirk that are more real than perhaps even Eric realises when he displays courage and honour to protect his friends in a perilous situation. Eric claims to John in private that Kirk represents all the qualities he aspires to, and that he has other personae, suggesting Eric has simply become a persona that he presents to his mother, just as Kirk is the persona he presents to the 1-2-1 Club. Kirk explains Eric in public as an undercover version of Kirk with his mother being his (male) operations controller in disguise, to whom he refers by the codename of "Z". In the series' final episode, Eric is returning with Kirk's dry-cleaned outfit when he sees his friends about to be beaten up by a group of Hells Angels. In homage to Superman, he retreats into the pub toilet and (after the Superman theme is played), emerges as Kirk, who swiftly dispatches the gang. Eric has an ongoing fascination with Kate, who (as Kirk) he nicknames 'Tiger'. Although in his Kirk persona they enjoy a combative relationship with insults and barbs regularly flying between them, he claims to John, and later Kate herself, that under the surface he is "kind of fond of her". In reality, he is smitten with her and tries to get John to organise a date for him. Apart from John, the rest of the group only ever meet the Kirk alter ego.
Louise (Rachel Bell) — the organiser and facilitator of the group.  Something of a Sloane Ranger, with a plummy accent, who often ends sentences with "Yah?" or "You will enjoy it", she divorced her husband because of his fetishistic tendencies and remains obsessed with other people's sex lives. This may be her reason for organising the group and is most certainly the cause of her catchphrase "Were there any sexual problems?" She also insists upon pronouncing Ralph's name in the more old-fashioned style of "Rafe".
Sylvia (Lucinda Curtis) — a nervous woman with an irritating laugh who divorced her husband because of his transvestism. She is held as a figure of fun by Louise who, much to Sylvia's embarrassment, often persuades her to share her experiences in front of the whole group. This is seen when Sylvia is moved from her Wednesday night meeting to John's Friday night meeting. Sylvia finds John attractive and makes an attempt to invite him to her house for a romantic meal. John does not feel the same way and the two never become involved any further than friendship. It is suggested that other members of her previous Wednesday night group found her highly annoying, resulting in an attempt by one member trying to run her over with a car (twice) and another pushing her off the top of Scafell Pike. This explains the reason for her being moved to the Friday night group.

Minor characters 
Mrs Arnott (Jean Challis) — quiet, hat-wearing Mrs Arnott (who suffers from depression) generally sits at the back dressed in dowdy clothing, occasionally chipping in with unexpected comments, such as that her husband used to make her play hoopla with ring doughnuts. Eventually, she leaves the group to look after her daughter's children when her daughter goes to work in Africa for VSO. She is often tactlessly referred to as "the fat lady" by Kirk. Even in her presence.
Toby Lacey (William Bates) — Ralph Bates's real-life son portrays his screen son, Toby.
Wendy (Wendy Allnutt) — John's sexually manipulative and bossy ex-wife.
Mike Taylor (Roger Blake) — Wendy's rugby-playing partner and one of the causes of John's marriage breakdown. John's ex-best friend, Mike was helped by John when he went through a bad patch in his life. Whenever John mentions Mike, he adopts an ape-like stance and likens him to the Honey Monster. 
Ken (Terence Edmond) — Ken is John's teaching colleague and he and his wife Maggie have a strained marriage. Despite using a variety of contraceptives, he and Maggie have still managed to produce five children, whose upkeep and company he finds a constant burden. In contrast to John's simple desire to have a simple, loving relationship, Ken wants to spread his oats and has nothing but envy for what he imagines is John's new life of sexual freedom. This is due to John 'beefing up' the image of the 1-2-1 Club with ridiculous accounts of members such as "the Filipino twins", and his exploits in "the hot tub", in order to make his dull life sound much more exciting. Even though John attempts to convince Ken that the tales are pure fantasy, Ken refuses to accept this and joins the 1-2-1 Club looking for adventure. In order to validate his reasons for joining, he gives a woeful tale to the rest of the group that he and Maggie have been divorced for some time, that they are childless and he'd always wanted children. He starts to become romantically involved with Kate who sees him as a kindred spirit but the affair is discovered by Maggie after Kirk gives her an anonymous telephone tip-off. Ken never discovers the identity of the real informer and blames John. Later in the second series, Ken and Maggie seem to be working on their differences and Ken agrees to have a vasectomy. His envy for (as he sees it), John's 'freedom' as a divorcee never entirely dissipates.  
Maggie (Sue Holderness) — Ken's wife; who finds him extremely irritating.
Mrs Lemenski (Irene Prador)  — John's neighbour. She is a Polish woman of advancing years, who frequently encounters John in embarrassing circumstances, such as hitting his head on the wall in frustration. She refers to him as "you loony person" or "fruitcake person". She reveals herself to be a lonely woman, who was widowed in the Second World War.
Mrs Morris (Sheila Manahan) — Kirk/Eric's overbearing Irish mother.
Ricky Fortune (Kevin Lloyd) — An ex-rock star who scored a 1969 one-hit-wonder entitled, Not on My Birthday, in Iceland, with his group Ricky Fortune & the Fortunates. He assumes that people know who he is, but they rarely do until prompted; whereupon they mostly recall that he was once on The Sooty Show. Upon his arrival to the 1-2-1 Club, his claims to celebrity are mocked by Kirk but he is instantly recognised by Mrs Arnott who, it transpires, is a lifelong fan; much to Kirk's annoyance. In an attempt to protect Ricky from Kirk's insults, John claims to have bought every record that The Fortunates made, yet when challenged (by Kirk) to name his favourite Fortunates track, cannot name one and merely states "They all were". Later, Ricky is booked to headline at a charity concert with Freddie and the Dreamers as the warm-up act. At this time, it appears that Louise has booked Freddie in Ricky's place and he has been cast aside. Embarrassed and angry, he leaves, and it is only after this point that the audience finds out that it was merely a misunderstanding and Ricky was to be the main act after all. Ricky is never seen again.

Episodes

Series 1 (1986)

Series 2 (1987)

Title music 

As with his other series, the title music was composed by the series' writer, John Sullivan. It was arranged by Ronnie Hazlehurst; the composer of music used in many BBC comedies and light entertainment programmes. Joan Baxter provided the vocals.

Home releases
Dear John appeared on video in 1998, three cassettes with both series and the Christmas special, under Playback Entertainment.

Acorn Media UK released both series of Dear John on DVD in the UK in 2010. The first episode is shorter than the one originally broadcast on BBC1 as contractual edits have been made, namely the removal of Beatles music during and at the end of the episode. The subtitles still show "Day Tripper" being played as John enters the community hall and acknowledges some men dressed in 'Fab Four' suits, but the music playing is actually muzak. And, at the end, when John and Kate discuss whether they will return the following week, Beatles music can be heard and silhouettes seen in an upper window of the centre. This scene has been totally removed.

References

External links
 
 Dear John at the BBC Comedy Guide
 
 

1986 British television series debuts
1987 British television series endings
1980s British sitcoms
BBC television sitcoms
English-language television shows
Psychotherapy in fiction